Diadegma agile is a wasp first described by Carl Gustav Alexander Brischke in 1880. No subspecies are listed.

References

agile
Insects described in 1880